The 1964–65 season was the 57th year of football played by Dundee United, and covers the period from 1 July 1964 to 30 June 1965. United finished in ninth place in the First Division.

Match results
Dundee United played a total of 45 competitive matches during the 1964–65 season.

Legend

All results are written with Dundee United's score first.
Own goals in italics

First Division

Scottish Cup

League Cup

Summer Cup

References

See also
 1964–65 in Scottish football

Dundee United F.C. seasons
Dundee United